Andal is a crater on Mercury.  Its name was adopted by the International Astronomical Union in 1976. Andal is named for the Tamil writer Andal, who lived in the 10th century.

References

Impact craters on Mercury